Chromosome 9 open reading frame 3 (C9ORF3) also known as aminopeptidase O (APO) is an enzyme which in humans is encoded by the C9ORF3 gene.  The protein encoded by this gene is an aminopeptidase which is most closely related in sequence to leukotriene A4 hydrolase (LTA4H). APO is a member of the M1 metalloproteinase family.

Structure
The C9ORF3 aminopeptidase enzyme contains the following domains:
 LTA4H-like N-terminal domain
 gluzincin aminopeptidase domain
 SH3-like motif
 ARM C-terminal domain

Function
The C9ORF3 aminopeptidase cleaves the N-terminal amino acid from polypeptides and shows a strong preference for peptides in which the N-terminus is arginine and to a lesser extent asparagine.  Furthermore, the activity of the enzyme is inhibited by o-phenanthroline, a metalloprotease inhibitor and by arphamenine A, a potent inhibitor of aminopeptidases such as LTA4H.  Also able to cleave angiotensin III to generate angiotensin IV, a bioactive peptide of the renin–angiotensin pathway.

Due to its aminopeptidase activity this enzyme may play a role in the proteolytic processing of bioactive peptides in those tissues where it is expressed.

Tissue distribution
C9ORF3 Messenger RNA has been detected in human pancreas, placenta, liver, testis, and heart. The expression in the heart suggests this enzyme may also play a role in the regulating the  physiology of cardiac muscle.  Several ApO isoforms are expressed predominantly in blood vessels suggesting that ApO plays a role in vascular cell biology.

Clinical significance
High expression levels of C9ORF3 is positively correlated with maximal oxygen uptake (VO2 max) and the amount of "slow-twitch" type 1 muscle fibers.

References

External links
 

EC 3.4.11